Carlos Prada Sanmiguel (27 December 1939 − 16 August 2013) was a Colombian Roman Catholic bishop.

Ordained to the priesthood in 1966, Prada Sanmiguel was named bishop in 1988. In 1994, he was named bishop of the Roman Catholic Diocese of Duitama–Sogamoso, Colombia and resigned in 2012.

References

1939 births
2013 deaths
People from Santander Department
21st-century Roman Catholic bishops in Colombia
20th-century Roman Catholic bishops in Colombia
Roman Catholic bishops of Medellín
Roman Catholic bishops of Duitama-Sogamoso